Bald Mountain is the highest mountain in the Pine Grove Hills of Lyon County in Nevada, United States. It is the most topographically prominent peak in Lyon County and ranks eighty-second among the most topographically prominent peaks in Nevada. The peak is located within the Humboldt-Toiyabe National Forest.

References 

Mountains of Nevada
Landforms of Lyon County, Nevada
Humboldt–Toiyabe National Forest